The 1950 Cornell Big Red football team was an American football team that represented Cornell University as an independent during the 1950 college football season. In its fourth season under head coach George K. James, the team compiled a 7–2 record and outscored its opponents 170 to 85. John Pierik and Charles Taylor were the team captains. 

Cornell played its home games at Schoellkopf Field in Ithaca, New York.

Schedule

References

Cornell
Cornell Big Red football seasons
Cornell Big Red football